Medvedovsky (masculine), Medvedovskaya (feminine), or Medvedovskoye (neuter) is the name of several rural localities in Russia:
Medvedovskoye, a village in Pronovsky Selsoviet of Vetluzhsky District in Nizhny Novgorod Oblast; 
Medvedovskaya, a stanitsa in Medvedovsky Rural Okrug of Timashyovsky District in Krasnodar Krai;